Gyalsumdo is a mostly undocumented Tibetic language spoken by an estimated 200 individuals of the Manang District in the Gandaki Zone of Nepal. In January 2018 the language was added to ISO 639-3 under the code "gyo."

Gyalsumdo is a tonal language; however in Gyalsumdo, unlike most other Central Tibetan languages, the word, rather than the syllable acts as the tone bearing unit. The language is reportedly closely related to the nearby Nubri and Tsum languages which share a large proportion of vocabulary. Gyalsumdo is also described as being somewhat intelligible by speakers of Nar-Phu.

References 

Manang District, Nepal
Languages of Nepal